The Kolonna Polling Division is a Polling Division in the Ratnapura Electoral District, in the Sabaragamuwa Province, Sri Lanka.

Presidential Election Results

Summary 

The winner of Kolonna has matched the final country result 7 out of 8 times. Hence, Kolonna is a Strong Bellwether for Presidential Elections.

2019 Sri Lankan Presidential Election

2015 Sri Lankan Presidential Election

2010 Sri Lankan Presidential Election

2005 Sri Lankan Presidential Election

1999 Sri Lankan Presidential Election

1994 Sri Lankan Presidential Election

1988 Sri Lankan Presidential Election

1982 Sri Lankan Presidential Election

Parliamentary Election Results

Summary 

The winner of Kolonna has matched the final country result 6 out of 7 times. Hence, Kolonna is a Strong Bellwether for Parliamentary Elections.

2015 Sri Lankan Parliamentary Election

2010 Sri Lankan Parliamentary Election

2004 Sri Lankan Parliamentary Election

2001 Sri Lankan Parliamentary Election

2000 Sri Lankan Parliamentary Election

1994 Sri Lankan Parliamentary Election

1989 Sri Lankan Parliamentary Election

Demographics

Ethnicity 

The Kolonna Polling Division has a Sinhalese majority (97.4%) . In comparison, the Ratnapura Electoral District (which contains the Kolonna Polling Division) has a Sinhalese majority (87.1%)

Religion 

The Kolonna Polling Division has a Buddhist majority (97.1%) . In comparison, the Ratnapura Electoral District (which contains the Kolonna Polling Division) has a Buddhist majority (86.7%)

References 

Polling Divisions of Sri Lanka
Polling Divisions of the Ratnapura Electoral District